Lena Aylin Erdil (born 28 February 1989) is a professional windsurfer from İzmir, Turkey. She is competing in the PWA World Tour mostly in the slalom event. She is currently sponsored by NRV, Starboard Windsurfing, Point7, Salzbrenner Würstchen and FGH.

Personal life
Lena Aylin Erdil was born to a Turkish father and a German mother in İzmir, Turkey on 28 February 1989. When she was two years old, the family moved to Göttingen, Germany, and at the age of ten, she moved with her parents to Brussels, Belgium. Her father Güven Erdil is a professor  of sports coaching serving as the Head of Sports Department at Marmara University's Faculty of Sports. Her mother Ellen was a primary school teacher of German language, and sports, who died from colorectal cancer at the age of 55 in 2016. Her father and mother had met each other while windsurfing. She spent her childhood years in Germany and Belgium. During summer holidays, she visited Çeşma, İzmir Province for windsurfing.

After completing high school, she received an athletic grant from the University of Sussex in Brighton, England, in 2009, where she majored in political science and philosophy. 

Following graduation, she returned to Turkey at the age of 24, and settled in Bodrum, Muğla Province, in the southwestern Aegean Region. In 2007, Erdil opened her own sports school, "Lena Erdil Windsurf Center", in the Ortakent neighborhood of Bodrum with the support of her parents. She hosts pro-X-training activities at her sports center.

In 2019, Erdil moved to Germany to settle in Hamburg.

Sports career
Erdil used to perform windsurfing in her youth with her parents during the summer holidays in Turkey. She received her first windsurfing board and gear at the age of 13 from her father.

The -tall sportswoman performs windsurfing professionally, competing in the freestyle, wave, and jump events in addition to her main class of slalom.  Although the slalom branch is not an Olympic discipline, she prefers it due to its high speed in racing. She also competes on teams. To remain fit for competitions, she exercises three to six hours a day in the summer months, and in the winter time, she goes to Cape Town, South Africa, for three months.

She debuted in competitive windsurfing at the age of 15. In 2005, Erdil won the junior champion title in the Turkish championship. After being successful in local races, she took part in Turkish championships, and then debuted internationally in 2006. She placed fourth at the 2008 PWA World Tour held in Alaçatı, Turkey, marking her first best international ranking. In 2012, Erdil took third place in the overall standings at the PWA World Cup after being runner-up in the Italian leg at Reggio Calabria. She improved her rank in the PWA World Cup's overall classification by placing second in 2014. 

At the 2015 International Funboard Class Association (IFCA) Slalom World Championship held in Sylt, Germany, she gained her first championship title, and the next year at the same competition in Brač, Croatia, she defended her title.  Also in 2016, she was the winner of the PWA World Cup's South Korean leg at Ulsan. As of 2016, she held eight championship titles in the Turkish Women's Slalom Championships. In the following competitions, she secured third or second place in almost every competition. In 2018, she finished the PWA World Cup season as the runner-up in the slalom event after placing second in the legs in Ulsan, South Korea, and Yokosuka, Japan, as well as ranking third in Viana do Castelo, Portugal.

She is the holder of the Turkish windsurfing record with  set during the 2012 International Windsurf Speed Record competition held in Lüderitz, Namibia. This is the second-best world record for women at all.

One of Erdil's main sponsors is Red Bull since 2011. She is nicknamed "Rüzgarin Kızı" (Daughter of the Wind) in her country.

Achievements

References

External links
 

1989 births
Living people
Turkish windsurfers
Female windsurfers
Turkish female sailors (sport)
Turkish sportswomen
Turkish expatriate sportspeople in Germany
Turkish people of German descent
Alumni of the University of Sussex
Sportspeople from İzmir